Suzanne M. Bump (born February 18, 1956) is an American politician who served as Massachusetts State Auditor from 2011 to 2023, the first woman elected to this role in the state's history. She is also a former State Representative and state Secretary of Labor and Workforce Development.

Early life
Bump was born on February 18, 1956, in Weymouth, Massachusetts. Her father was a funeral director and her mother was a homemaker. She attended Cardinal Spellman High School, received her A.B. from Boston College, and received her J.D. from Suffolk University Law School. According to her campaign biography, she grew up in Whitman and moved to Braintree after college. She later moved to Great Barrington.

Political career

She started her career off as a legislative aide. From 1985 to 1993 she was the state representative for the 5th Norfolk district, She served on the Commerce and Labor Committee, and she spent two years as Chairman of that Committee. From 2007 to 2009 she was secretary of labor in the administration of Governor Deval Patrick.

Secretary of Labor

Prior to Bump leading the Massachusetts Executive Office of Labor and Workforce Development, unemployment claims were handled on an antiquated processing system.  She was noted for securing funding and overseeing the roll out of modern telephone and computerized claims systems.  In 2008, Bump announced a regional partnership program that provided new funds to help ex-offenders achieve successful re-entry into communities. The program focused on high crime communities by both providing preventative public safety measures and acting as an economic boost to the regions that received funding.

Auditor

She resigned from Patrick's cabinet in order to enter the race for the position of auditor being vacated by longtime Auditor A. Joseph DeNucci. She won the primary and the general election and was sworn in as the State Auditor of Massachusetts on January 19, 2011.
Shortly after taking office, Auditor Bump led sweeping reforms following an independent review of the auditor's office.  The review found the office had workers without college level degrees, inadequate training systems, and unspecified job skills. As part of the reform, 27 employees were terminated and 14 were reassigned, and other employers with proper qualifications were given raises on par with national standards.
When Auditor Bump took over, the office was failing the National State Auditor's Association peer review standards. In two subsequent reviews, it passed with the highest rating. Her audits, investigations, innovations, and studies have identified over $1.3 billion in misused and wasted spending.

Major government agency audits
Auditor Bump's office conducts audits, and studies to promote accountability and transparency, improve performance, and make government work better. Her office identified 119 registered sex offender addresses that matched the registered address of a child care provider. Her office has also held the Massachusetts Sex Offender Registry Board accountable for missing addresses of 1,769 convicted sex offenders. Auditor Bump's team also found that the Department of Children and Families had significant deficiencies, including: incomplete records of the background checks on individuals living in foster homes and insufficient training, management, and technological resources for caseworkers. Her office's audit of MassHealth discovered the organization had over $500 million in wasted funds from 2009 to 2014. This audit now saves Massachusetts $10 million each year. Her office released a report that found that Massachusetts regional schools are being underfunded by $17 million. The Auditor recommended new ways to improve previously held assumptions about public education funding.

In the 2018 fiscal year, Auditor Bump continued to execute audits on a wide array of Massachusetts services. She determined that parts of the early voting law that went into effect in 2016 constituted an unfunded mandate on local governments. Her conclusion resulted in Massachusetts communities receiving over $1 million in reimbursements. In the same year, her audit of Salem State University resulted in the school increasing accountability in terms of its IT inventory and making better use of technology to ensure the university continues to adequately track computers, cell phones, servers, and other equipment. She called on the Catastrophic Illness in Children Relief Fund to reduce wait times for families with critically ill children which led to a 33% reduction in wait times. When Barnstable County asked for Auditor Bump's office to conduct an audit of the county government, she helped the community save hundreds of thousands of dollars. The year also included working with Greenfield Community College to improve its accessibility for students with disabilities and ensuring that the Public Employee Retirement Administration Commission (PERAC) was not awarding individuals greater retirement benefits than they are entitled. Through her duty to improve the integrity of public benefits programs, the auditor and her team identified $16.9 million in public assistance fraud in 2017. Since 1983, the Division of Local Mandates in Massachusetts has helped provide over $354 million in state funding, making the auditor's findings in 2017 higher than average.

In 2017, auditees reported that they implemented 92% of audit recommendations.

Bump received a national award from the National Association of State Auditors, Comptrollers and Treasurers.

Public benefits audits
Through her office's audit of the Department of Veterans Services, plans and recommendations were presented for how to better assist veterans moving forward. A 2013 audit of the Department of Transitional Assistance (DTA) detailed millions of dollars in questionable benefits, inadequate security over blank electronic benefit cards (EBT cards), and a need for improved fraud detection. The audit resulted in the state welfare agency creating an action plan to enhance its program integrity and restore public confidence. Another audit found 1,164 social welfare recipients that were either dead or using a deceased person's Social Security number. Her office "identified $15.4 million in public benefits fraud during fiscal 2016, primarily in the MassHealth insurance program and food stamps".

Technology-based audits and changes
Auditor Bump's team worked on solutions for data tools, one of which, coined the "Rules Based Risk Engine", won her the National Association of Chief Information Officer's State Recognition Award due to its ability to increase efficiency of the Office of the State Auditor. Her office created an IT audit unit to identify opportunities and potential threats to cyber security. One such audit found many weaknesses in IT security at the Massachusetts Housing Finance Authority.

Awards and recognition
In addition to her NSAA Excellence in Accountability award, and the National Association of Chief Information Officer's State Recognition award, Auditor Bump has received the Abigail Adams award from the Massachusetts Women's Political Caucus, the Einhorn-Gary Award, "Woman of the Decade" award from Emerge Massachusetts, and the "Woman of Justice" award from Massachusetts Lawyers Weekly.
She is currently serving on the boards of the Inspector General Council, Municipal Finance Oversight Board, U.S. Comptroller General's Domestic Working Group, the executive board of the National State Auditor's Association, is a partner of the Women's Suffrage Celebration Coalition of Massachusetts, and is a member of the Massachusetts Women's Political Caucus. 
In October 2016, Bump announced that she will be running for reelection in 2018 and will stay out of the day-to-day operations of two addiction treatment businesses she inherited from her late husband. Bump hired a new CEO to run them, and she had no authority in the daily operations of the businesses to avoid state conflict of interest regulations.

Personal life
Bump married Paul McDevitt in 1980. They remained married until McDevitt's death in September 2016. She resides in Easton, Massachusetts but often has to commute for job purposes.

Electoral history

References

External links

 State Auditor website
 Campaign website

|-

|-

|-

1956 births
20th-century American politicians
20th-century American women politicians
21st-century American politicians
21st-century American women politicians
Living people
Democratic Party members of the Massachusetts House of Representatives
People from Weymouth, Massachusetts
State auditors of Massachusetts
State cabinet secretaries of Massachusetts
Women state legislators in Massachusetts
Women in Massachusetts politics